Dawn of Possession is the debut album by Immolation. It was released on July 19, 1991; it was their first and only album released on Roadrunner Records. The album was re-issued and re-mastered by Metal Mind Productions as a limited-edition digipak, on April 24, 2006, with bonus videos.

Track listing
All songs written by Immolation.

Personnel
Immolation
Ross Dolan - vocals, bass
Robert Vigna - guitar
Tom Wilkinson - guitar
Craig Smilowski - drums

Production
Andreas Marschall - cover art
Carole Segal - photography
Harris Johns - engineering, mixing, producer
Patricia Mooney - art direction
Mark Mastro - logo
Renato Gallina - artwork (original logo concept)

Immolation (band) albums
1991 debut albums
Roadrunner Records albums
Albums produced by Harris Johns